Pitt Island is an island located within the traditional territory of the Gitxaala Nation  on  the  north  coast  of British Columbia, Canada.

Pitt island is located between Banks Island, across Grenville Channel (part of the Inside Passage) from the mainland, and is separated from Banks Island by Principe Channel.

Pitt Island is the only island in British Columbia known to host a resident population of Moose

Features
 Anchor Mountain
 Captain Cove
 Holmes Lake
 Hevenor Inlet
 Newcombe Harbour
 Pa-aat River
 Port Stevens
 Monckton Inlet
 Mount Hulke
 Mount Patterson
 Mount Frank
 Mount Saunders
 Mount Shields
 Wyndham Lake
 Red Bluff Lake

Protected Areas
 Union Passage Marine Provincial Park
 Maxtaktsm'Aa/Union Passage Conservancy
 Monckton Nii Luutiksm Conservancy
 Pa-aat Conservancy

References

Islands of British Columbia
North Coast Regional District
North Coast of British Columbia